Greatest Hits Plus is the first compilation album by American country music artist Ricky Van Shelton. It contains the hit singles from his first four studio albums, not including his gospel and holiday album.

Three new tracks on the album, including a cover of Elvis Presley's "Wear My Ring Around Your Neck" originally featured on the Honeymoon in Vegas soundtrack, were released as singles and had some chart success.

Track listing

Personnel

 Eddie Bayers - drums
 Steve Buckingham - acoustic guitar
 Gary Burr - background vocals
 Larry Byrom - acoustic guitar
 Richard Dennison - background vocals
 Paul Franklin - steel guitar, pedabro
 Sonny Garrish - steel guitar
 Steve Gibson - bass guitar, electric guitar, mandolin
 Rob Hajacos - fiddle
 Tommy Hannum - steel guitar
 Hoot Hester - fiddle
 Roy Husky Jr. - upright bass
 Carl Jackson - background vocals
 Bill Lloyd - electric guitar
 Patty Loveless - background vocals
 Randy McCormick - piano
 Terry McMillan - harmonica
 Jimmy Mattingly - fiddle
 Joey Miskulin - accordion
 Farrell Morris - percussion, vibraphone
 Louis Dean Nunley - background vocals
 Jennifer O'Brien - background vocals
 Mark O'Connor - fiddle
 Dolly Parton - duet vocals on "Rockin' Years"
 Don Potter - acoustic guitar
 Tom Robb - bass guitar
 Matt Rollings - piano
 John Wesley Ryles - background vocals
 Ricky Van Shelton - acoustic guitar, lead vocals
 Gary Smith - piano
 Howard Smith - background vocals
 Harry Stinson - background vocals
 Steve Turner - drums
 Paul Uhrig - bass guitar
 Bruce Watkins - acoustic guitar
 Biff Watson - acoustic guitar
 Tommy Wells - drums
 Bergen White - background vocals
 Dennis Wilson - background vocals
 Curtis Young - background vocals

Chart performance

Album

Singles

Ricky Van Shelton albums
1992 greatest hits albums
Columbia Records compilation albums
Albums produced by Steve Buckingham (record producer)